The 2022–23 Green Bay Phoenix men's basketball team represented the University of Wisconsin–Green Bay during the 2022–23 NCAA Division I men's basketball season. The Phoenix, led by interim head coach Freddie Owens, split their home games between the Resch Center in Ashwaubenon, Wisconsin and the Kress Events Center in Green Bay, Wisconsin. The Phoenix finished the season 3–29, 2–18 in Horizon League play to finish in a tie for last place. As the No. 10 seed in the Horizon League tournament, they lost to Wright State in the first round.

On January 31, 2023, third-year head coach Will Ryan was fired after starting the season 2–19. Assistant coach Freddie Owens was named interim head coach for the rest of the season.

Previous season 
The Phoenix finished the 2021–22 season 5–25, 4–16 Horizon League play to finish in 11th place. They lost in the first round of the Horizon League tournament to Detroit Mercy.

Offseason

Departures

Incoming transfers

2022 recruiting class

Preseason 
The Panthers were picked to finish in tenth place in the Horizon League in the coaches' poll, receiving a total of 111 points.

Roster

Schedule and results 

|-
!colspan=12 style=| Exhibition 

|-
!colspan=12 style=| Regular season 

|-
!colspan=9 style=| Horizon League tournament

|-

Source

References 

Green Bay Phoenix men's basketball seasons
Green Bay
Green Bay
Green Bay